Venus Mantrap is a Big Finish Productions audio drama featuring Lisa Bowerman as Bernice Summerfield, a character from the spin-off media based on the long-running British science fiction television series Doctor Who.

Plot 
Bernice travels to Venus to obtain the secret publishing royalties of her deceased husband Jason Kane and becomes embroiled in the politics of Venus' twin artificial moons, Eros and Thanatos.

Cast
 Bernice Summerfield - Lisa Bowerman
 Peter Summerfield - Thomas Grant
 Professor Megali Scoblow - Jo Castleton
 Safton Twisk - Ian Brooker
 N'Jok Barnes - Luke Sorba

External links
 Big Finish Productions - Professor Bernice Summerfield: Venus Mantrap

Venus Mantrap
Fiction set in the 27th century